The 1916 California Golden Bears football team was an American football team that represented the University of California, Berkeley in the Pacific Coast Conference (PCC) during the 1916 college football season. In their first year under head coach Andy Smith, the team compiled a 6–4–1 record (0–3 against PCC opponents), finished in last place in the PCC, and outscored its opponents by a combined total of 192 to 103.

Schedule

References

California
California Golden Bears football seasons
California California Golden Bears football